Two Creeks may refer to:
Two Creeks, Alberta, Canada
Two Creeks, Manitoba, Canada
Two Creeks, Wisconsin, United States, a town
Two Creeks, Wisconsin (community), within the above town
Two Creeks Air Force Station